Angling Lake/Wapekeka Airport  is located  west of the First Nations settlement of Wapekeka, Ontario, Canada, to the east of Big Trout Lake and on the south shores of Weir Lake.

The airport is operated by the Government of Ontario, and consists of a gravel runway with published instrument approaches. A gravel road connects to nearby community of Angling Lake.

Airlines and destinations

References

External links

Certified airports in Kenora District